Tahmina Rajabova (born June 29, 1982, Dushanbe, Tajik SSR) is a Tajik actress, journalist and newscaster. She was honored awards like “The Journalist of the Year” in 2013, “The award for distinguished contribution to the culture and art of Tajikistan” in 2013, and “The award of the TV and Radio Committee of Tajikistan” in 2017 and others.

Biography 
Tahmina Rajabova was born on June 29, 1982, in Dushanbe, Tajik SSR. Tahmina’s father was an economist and her mother was a doctor. From 1989 she studied in a musical school named after Malika Sobirova until her third grade. As her father moved to Moscow due to his job, their family left the country. Tahmina went to a Russian school and studied there for two years.

After she returned to Tajikistan, Tahmina graduated the secondary school in Dushanbe, and applied to the faculty of law, Institute of international and regional relations of Moscow in Dushanbe. She married after she finished her first year in university; for this reason, she couldn’t continue her studies and she had to drop out. After some time, she entered the Institute of Tax and Law of Tajikistan again and successfully graduated in 2006.

Family 
Under the influence of her parents, Tahmina married her cousin when she was 18, but they divorced after three years. She has a son – Muhammadjovid. Later, Tamina married again and she has a happy family now.

Career

Television 
Tahmina Rajabova started her career as a lawyer’s assistant in «Safina» (national TV) in 2006; after a month Nasiba Gulamova (newscaster and, later, Tahmina's teacher) noticed her. Having a TV face and good Russian, Nasiba Gulamova offered her to be a news broadcaster, and Tahmina accepted this offer. The movie directors noticed her on the TV, and counting her distinctive beauty, they offered her to star in movies.

Cinema  
Tahmina debuted in her film career by starring as an assistant of the investigator in «I want to live» directed by Unus Usupov, and then in «The last hope» directed by Said Kadiri. Tahmina played the second role in this film and passed a serious test in the field of cinema. Subsequently, she was invited to the film studio of «Tajikfilm» in order to play the main role in «Difficult cross» of Saidjon Kadiri.  

«The last hope» was awarded in the Cinema Festival «Didar» and some foreign movie directors showed interest in cooperation with Tahmina. One of them was Bulgarian movie director of Afgan origin - Asad Sikandar. Thus, she was invited to play the main role in Madrasa (now «Refugee») in collaboration with Bollywood actors in Afghanistan. Tahmina role was the mother of the family.

In 2011 Tahmina was invited to play a role of the third  wife in “A man's desire for the fifth wife” of Canadian- Afghan movie director - Siddiq Obidi that was shot in Farob and Balkh provinces of Afghanistan. Tahmina played the role of the 3rd wife successfully and was rewarded the title of «The best actress» in International Film Festival of India.

Humanitarian activity 
International Federation of Red Crescent Societies in Tajikistan launched a monthly project to involve the society’s attention to the humanitarian activities of the federation. Tahmina Rajabova was elected as the ambassador in this project. Tahmina says: “It was a pleasure to give orphans everything they needed for living. I visited orphanages even before and now a lot of children know me and call “apajon” (dear sister).

Filmography 
Tahmina Rajabova has starred in 20 films:

Cinema awards  
In the International film festival of India (IFFI), Tahmina Rajabova was honored for her role in the film «A man’s desire for the fifth wife».

References

External links
 
 
 
 
 

1982 births
Living people
Tajikistani stage actresses
Tajikistani film actresses